I Wanna Hold Your Hand is a 1978 American historical comedy film directed by Robert Zemeckis (his feature film debut), written by Zemeckis and Bob Gale, and starring Nancy Allen, Bobby Di Cicco, Marc McClure, Susan Kendall Newman, Theresa Saldana, Eddie Deezen and Wendie Jo Sperber. Its storyline follows a disparate group of teenagers over the course of one day in New York City as they attempt to gain entry to the Beatles' first live appearance on The Ed Sullivan Show on February 9, 1964. The film also examines the mass hysteria surrounding the event, dubbed "Beatlemania" for the fervency of the group's fans. The film's title is derived from the Beatles' 1963 song of the same name.

The film marked Zemeckis's feature film directorial debut, and was also the first film to be executive-produced by Steven Spielberg. Even though it was modestly budgeted, in order to convince Universal to bankroll it, Spielberg had to promise studio executives that, if Zemeckis was seen to be doing a markedly poor job, he would step in and direct the film himself.

Despite positive previews and critical response, the film was not a financial success and was considered a flop, unable to recoup its rather modest $2.8 million budget.

Plot
In February 1964, Ed Sullivan prepares for the Beatles' debut performance on his television show, which broadcasts from CBS Studio 50 in New York.

In Maplewood, New Jersey, Rosie and Pam visit their local record shop. Janis, a folk music devotee whose dad owns the shop, detests the Beatles. Grace wants to rent a limousine so they can pull up to the Beatles' hotel and get exclusive photos of the band. The girls recruit Larry DuBois, a shy teen whose father has access to limos. They leave for New York City and are joined en route by the brash and streetwise Tony who, like Janis, also hates the Beatles, preferring American pop music instead. 

At daybreak on the morning of February 9, the six teenagers arrive in New York. When they pull up at the hotel, which is already surrounded by screaming teenagers, Grace, Rosie, and Pam sneak inside, while Tony and Janis remain in the limo as Larry pulls the limo around to the side of the hotel.

Once inside the hotel, Grace and Rosie sneak into a service elevator, while Pam, who initially is not interested in seeing the Beatles, hides in a basement storage closet during which time she sees the group leaving the hotel to rehearse in the Sullivan theater. Grace gets off on the 11th floor, but Rosie goes up to the Beatles' rooms on the 12th floor; she is briefly caught but escapes and runs into Richard Klaus, a fellow Beatles fan who is hiding out in another room. They are both soon caught and tossed from the hotel, after which the two quarrel and go their separate ways. To avoid being caught, Pam hides in a food cart, which is taken to the Beatles’ room. When she finds their clothes and instruments, she revels in a moment of quiet euphoria. When the Beatles return to the room, Pam hides under John’s bed.

Grace is caught and thrown out of the hotel, so she goes to the theater, where a guard tells her that for fifty dollars he can let her in backstage. Larry asks Grace to the Valentine’s Day dance at school, but Grace, her mind fixated on getting the pictures, ignores him. To get the money, she decides to take the place of a prostitute who has a john waiting at the hotel. Once in his room, Grace hides and takes photos of the john with the hooker in an attempt to blackmail him for the money. He attacks her, but Larry, who has been getting progressively tipsy in the hotel bar, appears just in time to knock out the man and rescue Grace.

In front of the hotel, Janis befriends Peter, a boy with a Beatles hairstyle who is determined to see the show. He tells her that his dad has three tickets to get in, but refuses to give them to Peter unless he gets a haircut. Realizing that the Beatles themselves are providing the type of social cause that she believes in, Janis recruits Tony to steal Peter's dad’s wallet. He carries out the plan and gets the tickets, one each for Peter, Janis and Tony. While Janis wants simply to help Peter see the show and be himself, Tony plans to find a way to stop the TV broadcast.

Throughout the film, Rosie tries to win tickets from a radio disc jockey giving them out as prizes to listeners who can correctly answer trivia questions about the Beatles. After several failed attempts, Rosie makes it to a phone, calls in with the right answer, and finally wins two tickets. Pam gets caught, but she is treated kindly by the Beatles' staff and even interviewed by the press. Eddie, her fiancé, arrives to pick her up, but now realizing that she's not ready to get married, she leaves him behind and runs to the theater, using the ticket that the Beatles' road manager Neil Aspinall gave her to see the show.

Richard and Rosie get to the show, running into Pam in front of the theater.  Right before the Beatles go onstage, Tony grabs a fire axe from a doorway and goes to the roof of the theater, climbing the TV transmitter to sabotage the broadcast. Janis follows and tries to stop him, but Tony is dead set in his plan until lightning from a gathering storm strikes and knocks Tony from the transmitter.  

Larry parks the limo in the alley behind the theater and Grace makes her way to the back door, but a policeman catches him and prepares to arrest him for improper parking and driving without a license. But Grace runs back and uses the $50 to bribe the cop into letting Larry go. Now without the money to get backstage, Grace is temporarily disconsolate, but soon accepts Larry's offer to go to the dance.

While leaving the theater, the Beatles take a wrong turn and end up in Larry’s limo. As a mob of fans approaches, Larry drives off with the Beatles still in the back seat, and Grace gets to snap her photos.

Cast

Nancy Allen as Pam Mitchell
Bobby Di Cicco as Tony Smerko
Marc McClure as Larry Dubois
Susan Kendall Newman as Janis Goldman
Theresa Saldana as Grace Corrigan
Wendie Jo Sperber as Rosie Petrofsky
Eddie Deezen as Richard "Ringo" Klaus
Christian Juttner as Peter Plimpton
Will Jordan as Ed Sullivan
Richard Singer as voice of George Harrison
Read Morgan as Peter's Father
Claude Earl Jones as Al
James Houghton as Eddie
James Hewitson as Neil
Dick Miller as Sergeant Brenner
Kristine DeBell as Cindy the hooker
Mary Hudson  Girl in crowd
Murray the K as himself
Leslie Hoffman stunt double for Wendie Jo Sperber

Reception
I Wanna Hold Your Hand holds a rating of 90% on Rotten Tomatoes based on 29 reviews with an average rating of 6.8/10. The consensus states: "Its slapstick humor and familiar plot don't break any new ground, but I Wanna Hold Your Hand succeeds at recapturing the excitement of a pivotal cultural moment".

Janet Maslin of The New York Times wrote, "The gimmick behind 'I Wanna Hold Your Hand' is the fact that you never actually see the Beatles; the genius of the film is that you never miss them ... the sneakiness with which the neophyte director Robert Zemeckis skirts the issue is positively dazzling. The Beatles are both there and not there, and the paradox hardly even matters. This movie is about the fans and their hysteria, and so it's the shouts that count". Variety wrote that "the film's early development is too slow and the humor initially too broad. But it develops into a lively entertainment with many memorable lines and scenes. The film's biggest problem, the fact that The Beatles can't be shown, is turned into its greatest asset through Zemeckis' creativity". Gene Siskel gave the film three-and-a-half stars out of four and called it "nonstop good fun" and "the perfect summer film". (Years later, while giving a moderately positive review of Tom Hanks' 1996 directorial effort That Thing You Do on his TV review program with Roger Ebert, Siskel would cite I Wanna Hold Your Hand as a better treatment of the same kind of story than Hanks' film.)

Kevin Thomas of the Los Angeles Times described it as "exceedingly broad and boisterous", with "a clever premise, sturdy enough to aspire to 'American Graffiti's' perceptive nostalgia, but the film zeroes in relentlessly at the widest, least discriminating audience possible. The byproduct of aiming so low so steadfastly is a dose of sheer crassness that frequently overpowers the film's buoyant energy and sense of fun". Gary Arnold of The Washington Post called the film "Inconsistent but zestful", adding that "Zemeckis begins building up a head of steam and never entirely loses it, although the episodic script is an up-and-down, hit-and-miss proposition". Scott Meek of The Monthly Film Bulletin wrote that "certain scenes are successful and amusing... but the film rushes so desperately from one joke to the next that it never has more to offer than occasional moments of somewhat lumbering charm".

Zemeckis later said, "One of the great memories in my life is going to the preview. I didn't know what to expect [but] the audience just went wild. They were laughing and cheering. It was just great. Then we learned a really sad lesson... just because a movie worked with a preview audience didn't mean anyone wanted to go see it".

Soundtrack 

The soundtrack features 17 original Beatles recordings:

 "I Want to Hold Your Hand"
 "Please Please Me"
 "I Saw Her Standing There"
 "Thank You Girl"
 "Boys"
 "Twist and Shout"
 "Misery"
 "Till There Was You"
 "Love Me Do"
 "Do You Want to Know a Secret?"
 "P.S. I Love You"
 "Please Mister Postman"
 "From Me to You"
 "Money (That's What I Want)"
 "There's a Place"
 "I Wanna Be Your Man"
 "She Loves You"

The song "She Loves You" was featured twice toward the end of the film. The first time was during the group's appearance on The Ed Sullivan Show on February 9, 1964. For this sequence, stand-in Beatle lookalikes, dressed in identical attire and holding musical instruments in a similar manner, were seen mimicking the group's performance of the song from that show while being shown on the stage floor, albeit from a distance so as not to see their identities. The actual footage of the Beatles was revealed from the camera operator's point of view. These two elements were combined with reactions from the studio audience to recreate a historic moment in time. The second use of "She Loves You" came during the end credits.

Other songs by the Beatles, published years after their appearance on The Ed Sullivan Show, are referenced as in-jokes throughout the film. They are:
 "Helter Skelter", mentioned by an aristocratic woman who sojourns at the Beatles' hotel ("Things are all helter skelter!");
 "Get Back", mentioned by a cop trying to calm a riot against his arrest of a very young Beatles fan ("Get back girls, get back!");
 "One After 909", "909" being the number of the hotel room of a man who is searching for a hooker in New York;
 "Polythene Pam", in the name of "Pam Mitchell", the girl that manages to sneak inside the Beatles' room and then has fetishistic behaviours towards objects and musical instruments belonging to the group. "Polythene Pam" was inspired by an evening that John spent with poet Royston Ellis and his girlfriend, Stephanie. The three wore polythene (a common British contraction of the word and the IUPAC version of the word polyethylene) bags and slept in the same bed out of curiosity about kinky sex.
 "Norwegian Wood (This Bird Has Flown)", mentioned by a member of the Beatles' staff named Neil (probably a reference to the Beatles' road manager and personal assistant Neil Aspinall) while speaking to a cop after Pam has been discovered lying under John Lennon's bed  ("Is that the bird that was under Lennon's bed?", a reference to a widespread interpretation that sees in "Norwegian Wood (This Bird Has Flown)" a confession of adultery).  'Bird' is slang for a young woman.
 "Girl", once again during the scene in which Pam is discovered: the cop does not get the aforementioned "bird" allusion, and Neil promptly states: "Girl"; to make this reference even clearer, the cop answers: "Girl, girl" (mimicking the chorus of the song). Noticeably, as the dialogue goes on, Neil speaks about an arrangement he made with Brian (a reference to the real Beatles' manager Brian Epstein) concerning how to handle the situation with the press.

Home media 
The film was released on VHS and LaserDisc by Warner Home Video in 1989, under license from MCA Home Video. It was released in the UK on DVD and Blu-ray by Fabulous Films Limited in 2016. In the US it was released by The Criterion Collection on March 26, 2019, under license from Universal Pictures Home Entertainment.

References

External links
 
 
 
 
I Wanna Hold Your Hand: All Perfectly Normal an essay by Scott Tobias at the Criterion Collection

1970s teen comedy films
1978 comedy films
1978 directorial debut films
1978 films
American teen comedy films
Cultural depictions of the Beatles
1970s English-language films
The Beatles in film
Films directed by Robert Zemeckis
Films set in 1964
Films set in hotels
Films set in New Jersey
Films set in New York City
Films with screenplays by Bob Gale
Films with screenplays by Robert Zemeckis
Films about fandom
1970s female buddy films
1970s American films